Elections to the Australian Capital Territory Legislative Assembly were held on Saturday, 18 February 1995. The incumbent Labor Party, led by Rosemary Follett, was challenged by the Liberal Party, led by Kate Carnell. For the first time, candidates were elected to fill three multi-member electorates using a single transferable vote method, known as the Hare-Clark system. The result was another hung parliament. However the Liberals, with the largest representation in the 17-member unicameral Assembly, formed Government with the support of Michael Moore and Paul Osborne. Carnell was elected Chief Minister at the first sitting of the third Assembly on 9 March 1995.

This election was also the first time that the leaders of both major parties have been female at an Australian federal, state or territory election. It would also be the last time that this occurred until the 2020 Queensland state election.

Key dates
 Close of party registration: 12 January 1995
 Pre-election period commenced/nominations opened: 13 January 1995
 Rolls closed: 20 January 1995
 Nominations closed: 26 January 1995
 Nominations declared/ballot paper order determined: 27 January 1995
 Pre-poll voting commenced: 30 January 1995
 Polling day: 18 February 1995
 Poll declared: 2 March 1995
Source:

Overview

Candidates

Sitting members at the time of the election are listed in bold. Tickets that elected at least one MLA are highlighted in the relevant colour. Successful candidates are indicated by an asterisk (*).

Brindabella
Five seats were up for election.

Ginninderra
Five seats were up for election.

Molonglo
Seven seats were up for election.

Results

|}

I - Independent politician
M - Moore Independents

See also
 Members of the Australian Capital Territory Legislative Assembly, 1995–1998
 First Carnell Ministry
 List of Australian Capital Territory elections

References

External links
 ACT Electoral Commission
 ACT Legislative Assembly - List of Members (1989 - 2008)

Elections in the Australian Capital Territory
1995 elections in Australia
February 1995 events in Australia
1990s in the Australian Capital Territory